Without Words is the first remix album by California-based worship collective Bethel Music, and it is also the fifth album overall to be released. The album was released on March 5, 2013 by the group's imprint label, Bethel Music alongside Integrity Music.  Garrett Viggers and Gabriel Wilson produced the album together.
 
The album is an entirely remixed instrumental collection of select songs previously released by Bethel Music in an effort to explore "what it is to worship— without words."

Critical reception

 
David Jeffries, rating the album three stars at AllMusic, says "While it's fine background music for anyone, those most familiar with Bethel's output are going to get the most out of this soothing release." Stephen Luff, reviewing the album for Cross Rhythms whilst rating it seven squares out of ten, says, "I have to mention, however, that it took a number of plays of the disc for me to really "tune in" to what the album is all about as it is not like other "instrumental praise" albums and to the casual listener, it can sound a little like a film soundtrack. ... However, the project will reap rewards with frequent listening." At Indie Vision Music, Jonathan Andre gave the album a three star rating, concluding on a congratulatory note, "Well done Bethel for such an enjoyable and certainly timeless album that will forever change how worship instrumental music is made!" Jono Davies, indicating in a three star review at Louder Than The Music, says, "Creatively Bethel have made a stunning piece of music, just for me I would rather listen to a bunch of new songs with new expressive lyrics to help with my worship to God." Rating the album four and a half stars by NewReleaseToday, Marcus Hathcock confesses "When I first saw the concept of Without Words, I honestly expected an elevator music album of Bethel songs. I had no idea the depth of the artistry that would go into an album that doesn't have a single lyric." Awarding the album three stars from Today's Christian Music, Grace S. Aspinwall writes, "The whole album has great worshipful lyrics that dig deep into the soul."

Track listing

Personnel
Adapted from AllMusic.

 Jerry Aaronson – ham radio
 James Gabriel – string arrangements
 John-Paul Gentile – acoustic guitar
 Chris Greely – keyboards, mastering, mixing
 Nathan Grubbs – design, photography
 Daley Hake – photography
 Kiley Hill – project manager
 Hannah Jeanpierre – strings
 Brian Johnson – executive producer
 Jenn Johnson – vocals
 Timothy Jon – strings
 Jeremy Larson – string arrangements, strings
 Daniel Mackenzie – banjo, bass, editing, vocoder
 Amy Renee Miller – vocals
 Jason Miller – back cover photo
 Graham Moore – percussion, vocals
 Daniel Schafer – horn, trumpet
 Joel Taylor – executive producer
 Rebekah Van Tinteren – strings
 Garrett Viggers – banjo, Fender Rhodes, Hammer Dulcimer, harmonium, melodica, producer, pump organ, string arrangements, vocals
 Kendra Wieck – strings
 Gabriel Wilson – acoustic guitar, delay, drums, Fender Rhodes, grand piano, guitar, harmonium, keyboards, loops, Moog synthesizer, percussion, producer, programming, reed organ, string arrangements, typewriter, upright piano, vocoder

Charts

Release history

References

 

2013 remix albums
Bethel Music albums